The European Cricket League (ECL), is a professional Ten10 cricket league contested by the cricket clubs of European countries. It was formed with a goal to develop and popularize cricket in the European continent. The league was founded in 2018.

The league is played in the T-10 format among clubs all around Europe that are champions in domestic tournaments in their respective countries. The inaugural tournament in 2019 took place in La Manga Club, Spain with 8 clubs participating. VOC Rotterdam were crowned the champions who defeated SG Findorff by 101 runs in the final. It was viewed on live TV & streamed around the world in over 120 countries in more than 140 million households by over 40 broadcasters.

There have been two editions of the ECL, the first being in 2019. VOC Rotterdam won the inaugural edition, while Pak I Care Badalona are the most recent champions. The second edition took place in 2022 and involved 30 teams.

History
The league was founded in 2018 by Daniel Weston with eight official International Cricket Council member federations on board, namely Russia, Netherlands, France, Italy, Denmark, Romania, Spain and Germany for the first tournament in 2019. Event organisers have since increased the number of federations and eligible teams for future tournaments.

The 2020 edition was scheduled to be once again held at the La Manga Club in Spain, this time with 16 participants (up from 8 in 2019, with the additions of the Belgian, English, Finnish, Irish, Norwegian, Romanian, Scottish, and Swedish National Champions), but was cancelled due to the COVID-19 Pandemic in Spain. The 2021 edition was then scheduled to once again be held at the La Manga Club, but was again cancelled due to the COVID-19 pandemic.

ECL22 saw a massive expansion for the competition, seeing champions from 963 different club teams (plus the previous winners VOC Rotterdam) invited to take part. Bet2Ball was announced as the Title Sponsor, while Cryptocurrency Kiba Inu was announced to be sponsoring all 30 teams' jerseys.

ECL Board 
Fellow ECL board members Frank Leenders and Thomas Klooz were both part of the marketing team of the UEFA Champions League. Leenders and Klooz both joined TEAM Marketing (Team Event and Media Marketing) in 1992 and played significant roles in the rebranding of the UEFA Champions League during its formative years. Leenders went on to become managing director and a member of the Board of Directors, while Klooz rose to become CEO of TEAM and was also on the board of directors.

ECL CEO Roger Feiner is a former Director of Broadcasting at FIFA from 1999 to 2002, responsible for the global TV rights and TV broadcasting of the FIFA Confederation Cup in Mexico in 1999 and the 2002 FIFA World Cup in Japan/Korea amongst others.

Seasons and winners

References

European Cricket League
Cricket competitions in Europe
Multi-national professional sports leagues